Visual phototransduction is the sensory transduction process of the visual system by which light is detected to yield nerve impulses in the rod cells and cone cells in the retina of the eye in humans and other vertebrates. It relies on the visual cycle, a sequence of biochemical reactions in which a molecule of retinal bound to opsin undergoes photoisomerization, initiates a cascade that signals detection of the photon, and is indirectly restored to its photosensitive isomer for reuse. Phototransduction in some invertebrates such as fruit flies relies on similar processes.

Photoreceptors 
The photoreceptor cells involved in vertebrate vision are the rods, the cones, and the photosensitive ganglion cells (ipRGCs). These cells contain a chromophore (11-cis-retinal, the aldehyde of vitamin A1 and light-absorbing portion) that is bound to a cell membrane protein, opsin. Rods deal with low light level and do not mediate color vision. Cones, on the other hand, can code the color of an image through comparison of the outputs of the three different types of cones. Each cone type responds best to certain wavelengths, or colors, of light because each type has a slightly different opsin. The three types of cones are L-cones, M-cones and S-cones that respond optimally to long wavelengths (reddish color), medium wavelengths (greenish color), and short wavelengths (bluish color) respectively. Humans have trichromatic photopic vision consisting of three opponent process channels that enable color vision.

Visual cycle 

The visual cycle occurs via G-protein coupled receptors called retinylidene proteins which consists of a visual opsin and a chromophore 11-cis-retinal. The 11-cis-retinal is covalently linked to the opsin receptor via Schiff base. When it absorbs a photon, 11-cis-retinal undergoes photoisomerization to all-trans-retinal, which changes the conformation of the opsin GPCR leading to signal transduction cascades which causes closure of cyclic GMP-gated cation channel, and hyperpolarization of the photoreceptor cell. 

Following photoisomerization, all-trans-retinal is released from the opsin protein and reduced to all-trans-retinol, which travels to the retinal pigment epithelium to be "recharged". It is first esterified by lecithin retinol acyltransferase (LRAT) and then converted to 11-cis-retinol by the isomerohydrolase RPE65. The isomerase activity of RPE65 has been shown; it is uncertain whether it also acts as the hydrolase. Finally, it is oxidized to 11-cis-retinal before traveling back to the photoreceptor cell outer segment where it is again conjugated to an opsin to form new, functional visual pigment (retinylidene protein), namely photopsin or rhodopsin.

Transduction process 

To understand the photoreceptor's behavior to light intensities, it is necessary to understand the roles of different currents.

There is an ongoing outward potassium current through nongated K+-selective channels.  This outward current tends to hyperpolarize the photoreceptor at around −70 mV (the equilibrium potential for K+).

There is also an inward sodium current carried by cGMP-gated sodium channels. This "dark current" depolarizes the cell to around −40 mV. Note that this is significantly more depolarized than most other neurons.

A high density of Na+-K+ pumps enables the photoreceptor to maintain a steady intracellular concentration of Na+ and K+.

In the dark
Photoreceptor cells are unusual cells in that they depolarize in response to absence of stimuli or scotopic conditions (darkness). In photopic conditions (light), photoreceptors hyperpolarize to a potential of −60 mV.

In the dark, cGMP levels are high and keep cGMP-gated sodium channels open allowing a steady inward current, called the dark current.  This dark current keeps the cell depolarized at about −40 mV, leading to glutamate release which inhibits excitation of neurons.

The depolarization of the cell membrane in scotopic conditions opens voltage-gated calcium channels.  An increased intracellular concentration of Ca2+ causes vesicles containing glutamate, a neurotransmitter, to merge with the cell membrane, therefore releasing glutamate into the synaptic cleft, an area between the end of one cell and the beginning of another neuron. Glutamate, though usually excitatory, functions here as an inhibitory neurotransmitter.

In the cone pathway, glutamate:
 Hyperpolarizes on-center bipolar cells.  Glutamate that is released from the photoreceptors in the dark binds to metabotropic glutamate receptors (mGluR6), which, through a G-protein coupling mechanism, causes non-specific cation channels in the cells to close, thus hyperpolarizing the bipolar cell.
 Depolarizes off-center bipolar cells. Binding of glutamate to ionotropic glutamate receptors results in an inward cation current that depolarizes the bipolar cell.

In the light
In summary: Light closes cGMP-gated sodium channels, reducing the influx of both Na+ and Ca2+ ions. Stopping the influx of Na+ ions effectively switches off the dark current. Reducing this dark current causes the photoreceptor to hyperpolarise, which reduces glutamate release which thus reduces the inhibition of retinal nerves, leading to excitation of these nerves.

 A light photon interacts with a retinal molecule in an opsin complex in a photoreceptor cell. The retinal undergoes isomerisation, changing from the 11-cis-retinal to the all-trans-retinal configuration.
 Opsin therefore undergoes a conformational change to metarhodopsin II.
 Metarhodopsin II activates a G protein known as transducin. This causes transducin to dissociate from its bound GDP, and bind GTP; then the alpha subunit of transducin dissociates from the beta and gamma subunits, with the GTP still bound to the alpha subunit.
 The alpha subunit-GTP complex activates phosphodiesterase, also known as PDE6. It binds to one of two regulatory subunits of PDE (which itself is a tetramer) and stimulates its activity. 
 PDE hydrolyzes cGMP, forming GMP. This lowers the intracellular concentration of cGMP and therefore the sodium channels close.
 Closure of the sodium channels causes hyperpolarization of the cell due to the ongoing efflux of potassium ions.
 Hyperpolarization of the cell causes voltage-gated calcium channels to close.
 As the calcium level in the photoreceptor cell drops, the amount of the neurotransmitter glutamate that is released by the cell also drops. This is because calcium is required for the glutamate-containing vesicles to fuse with cell membrane and release their contents (see SNARE proteins).
 A decrease in the amount of glutamate released by the photoreceptors causes depolarization of on-center bipolar cells (rod and cone On bipolar cells) and hyperpolarization of cone off-center bipolar cells.

Deactivation of the phototransduction cascade
In light, low cGMP levels close Na+ and Ca2+ channels, reducing intracellular Na+ and Ca2+. 
During recovery (dark adaptation), the low Ca2+ levels induce recovery (termination of the phototransduction cascade), as follows:

 Low intracellular Ca2+ causes Ca2+ to dissociate from guanylate cyclase activating protein (GCAP). The liberated GCAP ultimately restores depleted cGMP levels, which re-opens the cGMP-gated cation channels (restoring dark current).
 Low intracellular Ca2+ causes Ca2+ to dissociate from GTPase-activating protein (GAP), also known as regulator of G protein signaling. The liberated GAP deactivates transducin, terminating the phototransduction cascade (restoring dark current).
 Low intracellular Ca2+ makes intracellular Ca-recoverin-RK dissociate into Ca2+ and recoverin and rhodopsin kinase (RK). The liberated RK then phosphorylates the Metarhodopsin II, reducing its binding affinity for transducin. Arrestin then completely deactivates the phosphorylated-metarhodopsin II, terminating the phototransduction cascade (restoring dark current).
 Low intracellular Ca2+ make the Ca2+/calmodulin complex within the cGMP-gated cation channels more sensitive to low cGMP levels (thereby, keeping the cGMP-gated cation channel open even at low cGMP levels, restoring dark current)

In more detail:

GTPase Accelerating Protein (GAP) of RGS (regulators of G protein signaling) interacts with the alpha subunit of transducin, and causes it to hydrolyse its bound GTP to GDP, and thus halts the action of phosphodiesterase, stopping the transformation of cGMP to GMP.  This deactivation step of the phototransduction cascade (the deactivation of the G protein transducer) was found to be the rate limiting step in the deactivation of the phototransduction cascade.

In other words: Guanylate Cyclase Activating Protein (GCAP) is a calcium binding protein, and as the calcium levels in the cell have decreased, GCAP dissociates from its bound calcium ions, and interacts with Guanylate Cyclase, activating it. Guanylate Cyclase then proceeds to transform GTP to cGMP, replenishing the cell's cGMP levels and thus reopening the sodium channels that were closed during phototransduction.

Finally, Metarhodopsin II is deactivated. Recoverin, another calcium binding protein, is normally bound to Rhodopsin Kinase when calcium is present. When the calcium levels fall during phototransduction, the calcium dissociates from recoverin, and rhodopsin kinase is released and phosphorylates metarhodopsin II, which decreases its affinity for transducin. Finally, arrestin, another protein, binds the phosphorylated metarhodopsin II, completely deactivating it. Thus, finally, phototransduction is deactivated, and the dark current and glutamate release is restored. It is this pathway, where Metarhodopsin II is phosphorylated and bound to arrestin and thus deactivated, which is thought to be responsible for the S2 component of dark adaptation. The S2 component represents a linear section of the dark adaptation function present at the beginning of dark adaptation for all bleaching intensities.

Phototransduction in invertebrates
Phototransduction process in invertebrates like the fruit fly is different from the vertebrates. PI(4,5)P2 cycle underlies the phototransduction process. Here, light induces the conformational change into rhodopsin and converts it into meta-rhodopsin. This helps in dissociation of G-protein complex. Alpha sub-unit of this complex activates the PLC enzyme (PLC-beta) which hydrolyze the PIP2 into DAG. This hydrolysis leads to opening of TRP channels and influx of calcium.

References

 Moiseyev G, Chen Y, Takahashi Y, Wu BX, Ma JX.  RPE65 is the isomerohydrolase in the retinoid visual cycle. Proc. Natl. Acad. Sci.  2005 Article.
 Jin M, Li S, Moghrabi WN, Sun H, Travis GH.  Rpe65 is the retinoid isomerase in bovine retinal pigment epithelium.  Cell.  2005 Article.

External links
Visual pigments and visual transduction at med.utah.edu
Transduction of Light Prezi
A General Overview on Visual Perception at brynmawr.edu

Visual system
Nervous system
Sensory receptors
Metabolism